Eratoidea watsoni is a species of sea snail, a marine gastropod mollusk in the family Marginellidae, the margin snails.

Description

Distribution

References

 Dall W. H. 1881. Reports on the results of dredging, under the supervision of Alexander Agassiz, in the Gulf of Mexico and in the Caribbean Sea (1877–78), by the United States Coast Survey Steamer "Blake", Lieutenant-Commander C.D. Sigsbee, U.S.N., and Commander J.R. Bartlett, U.S.N., commanding. XV. Preliminary report on the Mollusca. Bulletin of the Museum of Comparative Zoölogy at Harvard College, 9(2): 33–144
 Cossignani T. (2006). Marginellidae & Cystiscidae of the World. L'Informatore Piceno. 408pp.
 Oleinik A.E., Petuch E.J. & Aley IV W.C. (2012) Bathyal gastropods of Bimini Chain, Bahamas. Proceedings of the Biological Society of Washington 125(1): 19–53
 McCleery T. (2011) A revision of the genus Eratoidea Weinkauff, 1879 (Gastropoda: Marginellidae). Novapex, Hors série, 12: 1–111.
 Espinosa J. & Ortea J. (2015). Nuevas especies de la familia Marginellidae (Mollusca: Neogastropoda) de Puerto Rico, Cuba, México y los Cayos de la Florida. Revista de la Academia Canaria de Ciencias. 27: 189–242
 Fehse D. (2015). On the identity of Hespererato pallida Oleinik, Petuch & Aley, 2012 (Mollusca: Trivioidea: Eratoidae). Visaya. 4(4): 19–20

External links
  Rosenberg, G.; Moretzsohn, F.; García, E. F. (2009). Gastropoda (Mollusca) of the Gulf of Mexico, Pp. 579–699 in: Felder, D.L. and D.K. Camp (eds.), Gulf of Mexico–Origins, Waters, and Biota. Texas A&M Press, College Station, Texas

Marginellidae
Gastropods described in 1881